Shahbuz District is one of the 7 districts of the Nakhchivan Autonomous Republic of Azerbaijan. The district borders the districts of Julfa, Babek, and the Syunik and Vayots Dzor provinces of Armenia. Its capital and largest city is Shahbuz. As of 2020, the district had a population of 25,300.

Overview 
Covering 27 villages and plateaus of the Oyuqlucaqaya, Bazaryurd, Dərəbash, Qachdash, Nərkechi and Armudlu, the region of Dərəşahbuz was established in the 16th century and functioned up to 40th years of the 19th century. In 1925, it was named Narimanov District in the administrative-territorial unit of Nakhchivan (encompassing 30 villages) and renamed Shahbuz in 1930. In 1963, the district was abolished and given to the Nakhchivan (since 1978, Babak) region; Shahbuz has operated as an independent district since 1965.

In 2007, the settlement of Shahbuz was given city status. In 2013, by decree of President of Azerbaijan Republic, Qarababa village was dissolved and added into the administrative territory of the city of Shahbuz.

Shahbuz district is located in the north of NAR. It is a mountainous area. Salvarti (3162 m), Uchgardash (3156 m), and Kechaldagh (3115 m) are the highest points. Like the rest of the republic, many groundwaters flow in the region, such as badamli, batabat, caravansarai, bichanak and other mineral waters. There are sulfur, construction materials, peat deposits. The district has the river Nakhchivanchay River and its tributaries - Kuku, Shahbuz, Salvarti - and Ganligol and Batabat Lakes. "Badamli" resort was built near the Badamli mineral water plant.

Etymology 
There are different versions of the etymology of the name of Shahbuz. At the historical sources, first time the name of "Shahbuz" can be found on the map which shows treasury of copper coins of the state of Eldiguzids and in the historical work of Sharaf ad-Din Ali Yazdi "Zafarnama", historian of Amir Timur.

Population 
According to the State Statistics Committee, as of 2018, the population of region recorded 25.1 thousand persons, which increased by 4.5 thousand persons (21.8 percent) from 20.6 thousand persons in 2000. 12.7 thousand of total population are men, 12.4 thousand are women.

This indicator shows the number of people that live in this region in 2005:

Notable natives
Mammad Araz (14 October 1933, Nursu, Shahbuz District – 1 December 2004, Baku, Azerbaijan), People's poet of Azerbaijan.
Tagi Ahmedov, (born 1 February 1948, Güney Qışlaq, Shahbuz District) Chairman of the New Azerbaijan Party in Yasamal District and former chief of Baku Subway.

See also
 Shahbuz State Reserve

References

External links
 District of Shahbuz
  "Naxçıvan Ensiklopediyası" - 2 cilddə, II cild, Naxçıvan, 2005. 

 
Districts of Azerbaijan
Subdivisions of the Nakhchivan Autonomous Republic